Tangdukou is a town and the seat of Shaoyang County in Hunan, China. The town was established in 1953 and reorganized through the amalgamation of Huangtang Township, Xiatangyun Township and the former Tangdukou Town on November 24, 2015. It is located in the central Shaoyang County, the town is bordered by Xiaoxishi Township to the north, Jiugongqiao Township, Huangjing Township and Xiahuaqiao Town to the east, Baicang Town to the south, Jinchengshi Town and Huangtingshi Town to the west. The town was divided into 67 villages and 8 communities in 2015. Its seat is Shiwan Community.

References

Shaoyang County
County seats in Hunan
Towns of Hunan